The 2014 African Women's Championship, the 11th edition of the tournament, was held in Namibia. This tournament, organized by the Confederation of African Football, was also a qualification tournament for the 2015 FIFA Women's World Cup, with top three qualifying for the finals in Canada. It was played on 11–25 October 2014.

The tournament marked the first participation of Namibia in the African championship. Also for the first time the defending champions, Equatorial Guinea, were not taking part after failing to win their last qualifying round match.

Nigeria defeated Cameroon 2–0 in the final to win their ninth title.

Host
Namibia were awarded the hosting rights in October 2011. It is the first time they will appear in the final tournament.
There has been some criticism of the slow preparation and campaigning for the event. The national women's league will be suspended this year because all money is used for hosting the continental event.

Venues
The final tournament matches were held in two stadium venues located in Windhoek:

Qualification

A record 25 teams applied for the 2014 African Women's Championship. The top three teams from the 2012 tournament, Cameroon, Equatorial Guinea and South Africa received a bye to the second round. The preliminary round was held on 13–15 February (first leg) and 28 February–2 March 2014 (second leg), while the final qualifying round was held on 23–25 May (first leg) and 6–8 June (second leg).

Qualified teams

Format
Eight teams were divided in two groups and play a round-robin tournament. The top two placed teams advanced to the semifinals. The losers of those semifinals played in the third place match, while the winners faced off in the final. The top three placed teams qualified for the 2015 FIFA Women's World Cup.

Match officials
12 referees and 15 assistants were announced on 5 October 2014.

Referees
  Maximina Bernado (Angola)
  Thérèse Raïssa (Cameroon)
  Ledia Tafesa (Ethiopia)
  Christine Ziga (Ghana)
  Aya Irène Ahoua (Ivory Coast)
  Damaris Kimani (Kenya)
  Kankou Coulibaly (Mali)
  Insaf El Harkaoui (Morocco)
  Fadouma Dia (Senegal)
  Lilia Abdeljaoued (Tunisia)
  Aisha Ssemambo (Uganda)
  Gladys Lengwe (Zambia)

Assistant referees
  Rosalie Tempa (Benin)
  Botsalo Mosimanewatlala (Botswana)
  Élodie Bieiginin (Burkina Faso)
  Mona Mahmoud Atallah (Egypt)
  Trhas Gebreyohanis (Ethiopia)
  Emmanuella Aglago (Ghana)
  Mary Njoroge (Kenya)
  Lidwine Rakotozafinoro (Madagascar)
  Bernadette Kwimbira (Malawi)
  Fanta Idrissa Koné (Mali)
  Souad Oulhaj (Morocco)
  Aminata Dialo (Senegal)
  Ayawa Dzodope (Togo)
  Chafia Hendaoui (Tunisia)
  Mercy Zulu (Zambia)

Squads

Group stage
The draw was held on 19 July 2014 at 19:00 local time at Windhoek, Namibia.

All times are local (UTC+02:00).

Tiebreakers
The teams are ranked according to points (3 points for a win, 1 point for a tie, 0 points for a loss). If tied on points, tiebreakers are applied in the following order:
Greater number of points obtained in the matches between the concerned teams;
Best Goal difference resulting from the matches between the concerned teams;
Goal difference in all group matches;
Greatest number of goals scored in all group matches;
Fair Play point system in which the number of yellow and red cards are evaluated;
Drawing of lots by CAF Organising Committee.

Group A

Group B

Knockout stage
In the knockout stage, if a match is level at the end of normal playing time, extra time is played (two periods of 15 minutes each) and followed, if necessary, by kicks from the penalty mark to determine the winner, except for the third place match where no extra time is played.

Semi-finals
Winners qualified for thr 2015 FIFA Women's World Cup.

Third place match
Winners qualified for the 2015 FIFA Women's World Cup.

Final

Statistics

Awards
The following awards were given at the conclusion of the tournament.

Goalscorers
5 goals
 Desire Oparanozie

4 goals
 Asisat Oshoala

3 goals
 Gaëlle Enganamouit
 Ines Nrehy

2 goals

 Houria Affak
 Elizabeth Cudjoe
 Josée Nahi
 Portia Modise

1 goal

 Raissa Feudjio
 Christine Manie
 Fatou Coulibaly
 Ida Guehai
 Christine Lohoues
 Thomalina Adams
 Zenatha Coleman
 Rita Williams
 Gloria Ofoegbu
 Osinachi Ohale
 Ngozi Okobi
 Francisca Ordega
 Perpetua Nkwocha
 Esther Sunday
 Amanda Dlamini
 Refiloe Jane
 Mamello Makhabane
 Sanah Mollo
 Shiwe Nongwanya
 Susan Banda

Own goal
 Mariam Diakité (playing against Nigeria)

Team statistics

|-
|colspan="10"|Eliminated in the group stage
|-

References

External links

Tn Mobile 9th African Women Championship-Namibia, CAFonline.com

 
2014
Women's Championship
2015 FIFA Women's World Cup qualification
2014 in women's association football
2014 in Namibian sport

International association football competitions hosted by Namibia